Geographers' A–Z Map Company Ltd. is the largest independent map publisher in the United Kingdom, providing cartographic services, digital data products and paper mapping publications (including Street Atlases, Visitors' Guides, Great Britain Road Atlases, and The Adventure Atlas).

The company is based in Dunton Green, Kent.

Establishment
Geographers' Map Company Ltd. was established in London on 28 August 1936 by Alexander Grosz, with offices in Napier House, 24–27 High Holborn, London. The company's most famous publication, "The A-Z Street Atlas", was created by Phyllis Pearsall who took on the responsibility of creating the first edition. Pearsall spent hours walking the streets of London cataloguing house numbers, junctions and streets. The company sold every copy of her first London Geographers' A–Z Street Atlas, with the main customer being W.H. Smith and Sons.

By 1938, Geographers' Map Company Ltd. was selling 12 titles, with the maps being entirely created by skilled cartographers. With the outbreak of the Second World War, the government ordered the removal of street maps from sale so the business produced war maps for newspapers throughout the War.

1950s to present
By 1952 the company had over 30 publications covering the United Kingdom from London to Glasgow. The 1960s saw the company move to the Sevenoaks area in Kent and ownership move to the Geographer's Map Trust.

The 1970s saw the introduction of the now iconic A–Z to the company name.

The early adoption of technology and in particular the use of CAD/CAM Unix computers, and later the Windows PC, accelerated the pace of map publication, which resulted in a peak in sales during 2005. Subsequently, significant technological developments in the industry saw the increased availability of free mapping and satellite navigation, and the demand for paper production rapidly declined – ultimately resulting in the company's restructuring in 2013.

Geographers' A–Z Maps' digital offering is growing rapidly and is already in use by charities like London's Air Ambulance, public organisations, and private business, providing the familiar mapping solution at street scale.

Additionally, the company has started to include licensed brand products including Ben Sherman clothing and Paperchase stationery.

2012 Olympics
The Geographers' A–Z Map Company and its cartographic services team were the official suppliers of paper atlases and maps for the 2012 Olympic Games and 2012 Paralympic Games. They produced atlases that detailed transport information for navigating to the venues as well as other information.

Digital data range
Geographers' A–Z Map Company are now producing digital data, providing both the business user and high street customer exactly what they want through the additional technology of print on demand, custom map creation and digital data provision.

The product "STREET" is being upgraded to include full digital coverage of the United Kingdom.

Large Scale
LARGE SCALE is the most detailed mapping that the company provides. At 1:7,040 it covers the majority of UK towns and cities as well as all of central London. This mapping is used in the city centre mapping within the A–Z Atlas.

Street
STREET is the iconic A–Z dataset which was designed for readability, easy navigation and complete street and road labelling. This is the mapping found in an A–Z Atlas.

Main Road
MAIN ROAD is designed to be ultra clear, complete with street names and in-depth ancillary reference information. This data fits between the extensive detail of Street and the clarity of Road.

Road
ROAD is found in road atlases that cover the whole UK transport network including highly detailed representation of motorway junctions.

Mini Road
MINI ROAD is a small scale UK-wide map primarily used to show the UK transport network.

Gazetteer
The extensive geographic index from paper publications is available digitally and includes street names, hospitals, government buildings, and points of interest.

App development
Geographers' A–Z Map Company produces a number of smartphone apps that are available on most devices. Apps include: Cabbies Mate, A–Z London Tourist Map, London Super Scale Street map, Greater London map, Glasgow Premier Map.

References

Bibliography

External links
Geographers' A-Z Map Company Website
Geographers' A-Z Map Company Digital
A-Z Map Company 80th Anniversary History
A-Z Map Company 80th Anniversary Memorabilia
A-Z Map Company 80th Anniversary Timeline
Ordnance Survey Partner Profile

Cartography organizations
Map companies of the United Kingdom
Map publishing companies
Companies based in Kent
Publishing companies established in 1936
Maps of the United Kingdom
British culture
1936 establishments in England
Design companies established in 1936
British companies established in 1936